The AEKKEA-RAAB R-29 was a Greek single-seat parasol monoplane trainer and/or light fighter developed by Antonius Raab, a German aircraft designer, with his Greek partners and was the sole Raab aircraft to be developed in Greece.

Design and development
The airplane had wooden wings and an Elektron (alloy) metal-tube fuselage. However, there is no exact record for produced numbers. The R-29 was a new design developed by Raab's Greek company in late 1936 but shared structural characteristics with the preceding R-27 type (a type also first recorded as an AEKKEA-RAAB product by Jane's 1935 ed., most probably designed earlier by Raab and never produced), which featured an inline Hispano-Suiza 12Y engine, retractable undercarriage and twin machine-guns.

Export documents to Spain and Jane's (1936 ed.) reported it as a fighter, but Raab later described it as a trainer, which would be borne out by the low powered engine chosen. A batch of these aircraft, along with the Tigerschwalbe R-26V/33 (derived from an earlier Raab-Katzenstein model), were to be delivered to the Republican forces. Components of 30 aircraft were to be produced in Greece and shipped to Spain, where a subsidiary would carry out final assembly. An AEKKEA aircraft engineer, Georgios Pangakis, reported 40 (rather than 30) R-29s shipped to Spain, still missing engines and machine guns, which proved difficult to acquire. According to Raab, the Republicans gave roughly 60 incomplete airframes of both types, along with plans to the Soviets to be shipped back to the USSR.

The AEKKEA archives were destroyed and there seems to be no surviving images and only the contemporary Jane's provides a written description.

Specifications

See also

References

Further reading
L.S. Skartsis and G.A. Avramidis, "Made in Greece", Typorama, Patras, Greece (2003) (republished by the University of Patras Science Park, 2006).
Rolf Nagel and Thorsten Bauer, "Kassel und die Luftfahrtindustrie seit 1923", A. Bernecker Verlag (2015) 
 
Antonius Raab, "Raab Fliegt (Erinnerungen eines Flugpioniers)", Reihe Konkret, Hamburg (1984).

External links
L.S. Skartsis, "Greek Vehicle and Machine Manufacturers 1800 to Present: A Pictorial History", Marathon (2012) (ebook)

1930s Greek fighter aircraft
Aircraft manufactured in Greece